The Neolithic decline was a rapid collapse in populations between five and six thousand years ago (approximately 3000 BC) during the Neolithic period in western Eurasia. The specific causes of that broad population decline are still debated. While heavily-populated settlements were regularly created, abandoned, and resettled during the Neolithic, after around 5400 years ago, a great number of those settlements were permanently abandoned. The population decline is associated with worsening agricultural conditions and a decrease in cereal production. Other suggested causes include the emergence of communicable diseases spread from animals living in close quarters with humans.

Conditions for the population increase that preceded the decline are generally ascribed to rapid population growth between 5950 and 5550 BP. That growth was catalysed by the introduction of agriculture, along with the spread of technologies such as pottery, the wheel, and animal husbandry. After the Neolithic decline, there were massive human migrations from the Pontic–Caspian steppe into eastern and central Europe, in approximately 4600 BP.

Plague 
Rascovan et al (2019) suggest that plague could have also caused the population decline. That is supported by the discovery of a tomb in modern-day Sweden containing 79 corpses buried within a short time, in which the authors discovered fragments of a unique strain of the plague pathogen Yersinia pestis. The authors note that the strain contained the "plasminogen activator gene that is sufficient to cause pneumonic plague", an extremely deadly form of the plague which is airborne and directly communicable between humans.

A similar site was found in China in 2011. The site Hamin Mangha in northeast China dates back to approximately 5000 years ago and features a small structure filled with almost 100 bodies. This could mean the location faced an outbreak that surpassed what the village could handle. Two other sites like these have been found in Northeast China: Miaozigou and Laijia, but archaeologists did not speculate as to the causal agent.

Some studies have contested the hypothesis that the plague was responsible for the Neolithic decline. Analysis of the plague bacteria that infected a hunter-gatherer in Latvia during this period indicates that, unlike modern plague strains, the strain which afflicted this man was incapable of causing flea-spread bubonic plague and could only cause septicemic plague via a rodent bite or a largely non-contagious case of pneumonic plague, implying that the disease would have had difficulty spreading across vast distances in a short amount of time.

References

Sources 
 
 

Eurasian history
Decline
Plague pandemics
Societal collapse